The following is a list of notable deaths in September 1989.

Entries for each day are listed alphabetically by surname. A typical entry lists information in the following sequence:
 Name, age, country of citizenship at birth, subsequent country of citizenship (if applicable), reason for notability, cause of death (if known), and reference.

September 1989

4
Georges Simenon, 86, Belgian novelist and short story writer, remembered for creating the fictional detective Jules Maigret. Died due to natural causes.
Ronald Syme, 86, New Zealand-born British historian and classicist, expert in the history of the Roman Empire.

8
Keef Cowboy, 28, American hip hop recording artist. Death caused by drug overdose.

9
Tim Hovey, 44, American child actor, musician, road manager, and audio engineer. Committed suicide by an intentional drug overdose.

13
Charles H. Russell, 85, American politician, governor of Nevada.

14
Pérez Prado, 72, Cuban bandleader, pianist, composer, and arranger. Death caused by complications from a stroke.

15
Robert Penn Warren, 84, American novelist, poet, and literary critic, co-founder of the literary journal The Southern Review. Death caused by prostate cancer.

21
Gene Nobles, 76, American radio disc jockey.

22
Irving Berlin, 101, Russian-born American composer, songwriter, and lyricist. Death caused by a heart attack.

28
Ferdinand Marcos, 72, Filipino politician and dictator, president of the Philippines. Death caused by organ failure in his kidney, heart, and lung.

30
Huỳnh Tấn Phát, 76, South Vietnamese communist politician and revolutionary, chairman of the Provisional Revolutionary Government of the Republic of South Vietnam, and deputy chairman of the Council of State. 
Virgil Thomson, 92, American composer and music critic.

References 

1989-09
 09